This is a shortened version of the fifth chapter of the ICD-9: Mental Disorders. It covers ICD codes 290 to 319. The full chapter can be found on pages 177 to 213 of Volume 1, which contains all (sub)categories of the ICD-9. Volume 2 is an alphabetical index of Volume 1. Both volumes can be downloaded for free from the website of the World Health Organization. See here for a PDF file of only the mental disorders chapter.

Chapter 5 of the ICD-9, which was first published in 1977, was used in the field of psychiatry for approximately three and a half decades. In the United States, an extended version of the ICD-9 was developed called the ICD-9-CM. Several editions of the Diagnostic and Statistical Manual of Mental Disorders, or the DSM, interfaced with the codes of the ICD-9-CM. Following the DSM-II (1968), which used the ICD-8, the ICD-9-CM was used by the DSM-III (1980), the DSM-III-R (1987), the DSM-IV (1994), and the DSM-IV-TR (2000). The DSM-5 (2013), the current version, also features ICD-9-CM codes, listing them alongside the codes of Chapter V of the ICD-10-CM. On 1 October 2015, the United States health care system officially switched from the ICD-9-CM to the ICD-10-CM.

The DSM is the authoritative reference work in diagnosing mental disorders in the world. The ICD system is used to code these disorders, and strictly seen, the ICD has always been the official system of diagnosing mental diseases in the United States. Due to the dominance of the DSM, however, not even many professionals within psychiatry realize this. The DSM and the ICD form a 'dual-system': the DSM is used for categories and diagnostic criteria, while the ICD-codes are used to make reimbursement claims towards the health insurance companies. The ICD also contains diagnostic criteria, but for the most part, therapists use those in the DSM. This structure has been criticized, with people wondering why there should be two separate systems for classification of mental disorders. It has been proposed that the ICD supersede the DSM.

Psychosis (290–299)

Organic psychotic conditions (290–294)
  Senile and presenile organic psychotic conditions
  Senile dementia, simple type
  Presenile dementia
  Senile dementia, depressed or paranoid type
  Senile dementia with acute confusional state
  Arteriosclerotic dementia
  Other senile and presenile organic psychotic conditions
  Unspecified senile and presenile organic psychotic conditions
  Alcoholic psychoses
  Delirium tremens
  Korsakov's psychosis, alcoholic
  Other alcoholic dementia
  Other alcoholic hallucinosis
  Pathological drunkenness
  Alcoholic jealousy
  Other alcoholic psychoses (Include: Alcohol withdrawal syndrome)
  Unspecified alcoholic psychoses (Include: alcoholic mania NOS, alcoholic psychosis NOS, alcoholism (chronic) with psychosis)
  Drug psychoses
  Drug withdrawal syndrome
  Paranoid and/or hallucinatory states induced by drugs
  Pathological drug intoxication
  Other drug psychoses
  Unspecified drug psychoses
  Unspecified drug-induced mental disorder
  Transient organic psychotic conditions
  Acute confusional state
  Subacute confusional state
  Other transient organic psychotic conditions
  Unspecified transient organic psychotic conditions
  Other organic psychotic conditions (chronic)
  Korsakov's psychosis or syndrome (nonalcoholic)
  Dementia in conditions classified elsewhere
  Other (Include: Mixed paranoid and affective organic psychotic states, epileptic psychosis NOS (code also ))
  Unspecified

Other psychoses (295–299)
  Schizophrenic psychoses
  Simple type
  Hebephrenic type
  Catatonic type
  Paranoid type
  Acute schizophrenic episode
  Latent schizophrenia (Include: latent schizophrenic reaction; schizophrenia: borderline, prepsychotic, prodromal; schizophrenia: pseudoneurotic, pseudopsychopathic)
  Residual schizophrenia (Include: chronic undifferentiated schizophrenia, Restzustand (schizophrenic), schizophrenic residual state)
  Schizoaffective type (Include: cyclic schizophrenia, mixed schizophrenic and affective psychosis, schizoaffective psychosis, schizophreniform psychosis, affective type)
  Other specified types of schizophrenia (Include: acute (undifferentiated), atypical schizophrenia, coenesthopathic schizophrenia)
  Unspecified schizophrenia (Include: schizophrenia NOS, schizophrenic reaction NOS, schizophreniform psychosis NOS)
  Affective psychoses
  Manic-depressive psychosis, manic type
  Manic-depressive psychosis, depressed type
  Manic-depressive psychosis, circular type but currently manic
  Manic-depressive psychosis, circular type but currently depressed
  Manic-depressive psychosis, circular type, mixed
  Manic-depressive psychosis, circular type, current condition not specified
  Manic-depressive psychosis, other and unspecified
  Other affective psychoses
  Unspecified affective psychoses (Include: affective psychosis NOS, Melancholia NOS)
  Paranoid states
  Paranoid state, simple
  Paranoia
  Paraphrenia (Include: involutional paranoid state, late paraphrenia)
  Induced psychosis
  Other specified paranoid states (Include: Paranoia querulans, Sensitiver Beziehungswahn)
  Unspecified paranoid state (Paranoid: psychosis NOS/reaction NOS/state NOS)
  Other nonorganic psychoses
  Depressive type psychosis
  Excitative type psychosis
  Reactive confusion (Include: psychogenic confusion, psychogenic twilight state)
  Acute paranoid reaction (Include: Bouffée délirante)
  Psychogenic paranoid psychosis (Include: protracted reactive paranoid psychosis)
  Other and unspecified reactive psychosis (Include: hysterical psychosis, psychogenic stupor, psychogenic psychosis NOS)
  Unspecified psychosis (Include: psychosis NOS)
  Psychoses with origin specific to childhood
  Infantile autism (Include: childhood autism, Kanner's syndrome, infantile psychosis)
  Disintegrative psychosis (Include: Heller's syndrome)
  Other specified pervasive developmental disorders (Include: atypical childhood psychosis)
  Unspecified psychoses with origin specific to childhood (Include: Child psychosis NOS, Schizophrenia, childhood type NOS, Schizophrenic syndrome of childhood NOS)

Neurotic disorders, personality disorders, and other nonpsychotic mental disorders (300–316)

Neurotic disorders (300)
  Neurotic disorders
  Anxiety states
  Hysteria (Include: Astasia-abasia, hysterical; Compensation neurosis; Conversion hysteria; Conversion reaction; Dissociative reaction or state; Ganser's syndrome, hysterical; Hysteria NOS; Multiple personality)
  Phobic state (Include: Agoraphobia; Animal phobias; Anxiety-hysteria; Claustrophobia; Phobia NOS)
  Obsessive-compulsive disorders
  Neurotic depression (Include: Anxiety depression; Neurotic depressive state; Depressive reaction; Reactive depression)
  Neurasthenia (Include: Nervous debility)
  Depersonalization syndrome (Include: Derealization (neurotic))
  Hypochondriasis
  Other neurotic disorders (Include: Briquet's disorder; Occupational neurosis, including writer's cramp; Psychasthenia, Psychasthenic neurosis)
  Unspecified neurotic disorders (Include: Neurosis NOS, Psychoneurosis NOS)

Personality disorders (301)
  Personality disorders
  Paranoid personality disorder (Include: fanatic personality, paranoid personality (disorder), paranoid traits)
  Affective personality disorder (Include: cycloid personality, cyclothymic personality, depressive personality)
  Schizoid personality disorder
  Explosive personality disorder (Include: aggressive: personality/reaction, aggressiveness, emotional instability (excessive), pathological emotionality, quarrelsomeness)
  Anankastic personality disorder (Include: compulsive personality, obsessional personality)
  Hysterical personality disorder (Include: histrionic personality, psychoinfantile personality)
  Asthenic personality disorder (Include: dependent personality, inadequate personality, passive personality)
  Personality disorder with predominantly sociopathic or asocial manifestation (Include: amoral personality, asocial personality, antisocial personality)
  Other personality disorders (Include: personality: eccentric, "haltlose" type; personality: immature, passive–aggressive, psychoneurotic)
  Unspecified personality disorder (Include: pathological personality NOS, personality disorder NOS, psychopathic: constitutional state, personality (disorder))

Sexual deviations and disorders (302)
  Sexual deviations and disorders
  Ego-dystonic sexual orientation; until 1990: homosexuality, include: lesbianism
  Bestiality
  Pedophilia
  Transvestism
  Exhibitionism
  Trans-sexualism
  Disorders of psychosexual identity (Include: Gender-role disorder)
  Frigidity and impotence (Include: Dyspareunia, psychogenic)
  Other sexual deviations and disorders (Include: fetishism, masochism, sadism)
  Unspecified sexual deviations and disorders

Psychoactive substance (303–305)
  Alcohol dependence syndrome (Include: acute drunkenness in alcoholism, dipsomania, chronic alcoholism)
  Drug dependence
  Morphine type dependence (Include drugs: heroin, methadone, opium, opium alkaloids and their derivatives, synthetics with morphine-like effects)
  Barbiturate type dependence
  Cocaine dependence
  Cannabis dependence
  Amphetamine and other psychostimulant dependence (Include drugs: phenmetrazine, methylphenidate)
  Hallucinogen dependence (Include drugs: LSD and derivatives, mescaline, psilocybin)
  Other drug dependence (Include: absinthe addiction, glue sniffing)
  Combinations of morphine type drug with any other
  Combinations excluding morphine type drug
  Unspecified drug dependence (Include: drug addiction NOS, drug dependence NOS)
  Nondependent abuse of drugs
  Alcohol abuse (Include: Drunkenness NOS; Excessive drinking of alcohol NOS; "Hangover" (alcohol); Inebriety NOS)
  Tobacco abuse
  Cannabis abuse
  Hallucinogens abuse (Include: LSD reaction)
  Barbiturates and tranquillizers abuse
  Morphine type abuse
  Cocaine type abuse
  Amphetamine type abuse
  Antidepressants abuse
  Other, mixed or unspecified (Include: "laxative habit", misuse of drugs NOS, nonprescribed use of drugs or patent medicinals)

Other (primarily adult onset) (306–311)
  Physiological malfunction arising from mental factors
  Musculoskeletal (Include: psychogenic torticollis)
  Respiratory (Include: air hunger hiccough (psychogenic), hyperventilation, psychogenic cough, yawning)
  Cardiovascular (Include: cardiac neurosis, cardiovascular neurosis, neurocirculatory asthenia, psychogenic cardiovascular disorder)
  Skin (Include: psychogenic pruritus)
  Gastrointestinal (Include: aerophagy; cyclical vomiting, psychogenic)
  Genitourinary (Include: psychogenic dysmenorrhoea)
  Endocrine
  Organs of special sense
  Other (Include: teeth-grinding)
  Special symptoms or syndromes, not elsewhere classified
  Stammering and stuttering
  Anorexia nervosa
  Tics
  Stereotyped repetitive movements (Include: stereotypies NOS)
  Specific disorders of sleep (of nonorganic origin)
  Other and unspecified disorders of eating (of nonorganic origin)
  Enuresis
  Encopresis
  Psychalgia (Include: tension headache, psychogenic backache)
  Other and unspecified (Include: hair plucking, lalling, lisping, masturbation, nail-biting, thumb-sucking)
  Acute reaction to stress
  Predominant disturbance of emotions
  Predominant disturbance of consciousness
  Predominant psychomotor disturbance
  Other acute reactions to stress
  Mixed disorders as reaction to stress
  Adjustment reaction
  Brief depressive reaction
  Prolonged depressive reaction
  With predominant disturbance of other emotions (Include: abnormal separation anxiety, culture shock)
  With predominant disturbance of conduct
  With mixed disturbance of emotions and conduct
  Other adjustment reactions (Include: adjustment reaction with elective mutism, hospitalism in children NOS)
  Unspecified adjustment reactions (Include: adjustment reaction NOS, adaptation reaction NOS)
  Specific nonpsychotic mental disorders following organic brain damage
  Frontal lobe syndrome (Include: Lobotomy syndrome, Postleucotomy syndrome (state))
  Cognitive or personality change of other type (Include: mild memory disturbance, organic psychosyndrome of nonpsychotic severity)
  Postconcussional syndrome (Include: Postcontusional syndrome (encephalopathy), status post commotio cerebri; post-traumatic brain syndrome, nonpsychotic)
  Other specific nonpsychotic mental disorders following organic brain damage (Include: other focal (partial) organic psychosyndromes)
  Unspecified specific nonpsychotic mental disorders following organic brain damage
  Depressive disorder, not elsewhere classified (Include: depressive disorder NOS, depressive state NOS, depression NOS)

Mental disorders diagnosed in childhood (312–316)
  Disturbance of conduct, not elsewhere classified
  Unsocialized disturbance of conduct (Include: unsocialized aggressive disorder)
  Socialized disturbance of conduct (Include: group delinquency)
  Compulsive conduct disorder (Include: Kleptomania)
  Mixed disturbance of conduct and emotions (Include: neurotic delinquency)
  Other disturbance of conduct not elsewhere classified
  Unspecified disturbance of conduct not elsewhere classified
  Disturbance of emotions specific to childhood and adolescence
  Disturbance of emotions specific to childhood and adolescence with anxiety and fearfulness (Include: overanxious reaction of childhood or adolescence)
  Disturbance of emotions specific to childhood and adolescence with misery and unhappiness
  Disturbance of emotions specific to childhood and adolescence with sensitivity, shyness and social withdrawal (Include: withdrawing reaction of childhood or adolescence)
  Relationship problems (Include: sibling jealousy)
  Disturbance of emotions specific to childhood and adolescence, other or mixed
  Unspecified disturbance of emotions specific to childhood and adolescence 
  Hyperkinetic syndrome of childhood
  Simple disturbance of activity and attention (Include: overactivity NOS)
  Hyperkinesis with developmental delay (Include: developmental disorder of hyperkinesis)
  Hyperkinetic conduct disorder
  Other hyperkinetic syndrome of childhood
  Unspecified hyperkinetic syndrome of childhood (Include: hyperkinetic reaction of childhood or adolescence NOS, hyperkinetic syndrome NOS)
  Specific delays in development
  Specific reading retardation (Include: developmental dyslexia, specific spelling difficulty)
  Specific arithmetical retardation (Include: Dyscalculia)
  Other specific developmental learning difficulties
  Developmental speech or language disorder (Include: developmental aphasia, dyslalia)
  Specific motor retardation (Include: clumsiness syndrome, dyspraxia syndrome)
  Mixed development disorder
  Other specified delays in development
  Unspecified specific delays in development (Include: developmental disorder NOS)
  Psychic factors associated with diseases classified elsewhere

Mental retardation (317–319)
  Mild mental retardation (Include: feeble-minded, high-grade defect, mild mental subnormality, moron)
  Other specified mental retardation
  Moderate mental retardation (Include: imbecile, moderate mental subnormality)
  Severe mental retardation (Include: severe mental subnormality)
  Profound mental retardation (Include: idiocy, profound mental subnormality)
  Unspecified mental retardation (Include: mental deficiency NOS, mental subnormality NOS)

References

International Classification of Diseases